NH-8 Road to Nidhivan is an Indian Psychological- Suspense Thriller film directed by Munindra Gupta and produced by Sunil Goel and Niharika Jha. The film is released on 17 April 2015.

Cast
Auroshikha Dey
Ravneet Kaur
Satyakaam Anand
Arjun Fauzdar
Swaroopa Ghosh
Jatin Sarna

Plot
The gripping film is inspired by true stories of the mysterious conception of Nidhivan, a place near Mathura. The film is set against the backdrop of a road trip of four friends from Mumbai to Nidhivan, a place close to Mathura (Uttar Pradesh). The film shows the actual stay of teams inside nidhivan

References

External links
 

2015 films
2010s Hindi-language films
Indian horror thriller films
Indian psychological thriller films
2015 horror films
2015 horror thriller films
2015 psychological thriller films